Ken Helm is an American politician from Oregon. A Democrat, he serves in the Oregon House of Representatives, representing House District 34 in the West Hills outside Portland. He lives in Beaverton. Helm was first elected in 2014, winning the Democratic primary on May 20, 2014, and facing no Republican opposition in the general election.

Personal life
Helm grew up in Bend and lived briefly in Chicago as an adult. He is a land use lawyer by training, starting his career as a clerk for the Oregon Land Use Board of Appeals. Helm is a member of the Kappa Sigma Fraternity.

External links
 Campaign website
 Legislative website

References

Living people
Democratic Party members of the Oregon House of Representatives
Politicians from Beaverton, Oregon
Politicians from Bend, Oregon
Willamette University alumni
Oregon lawyers
Willamette University College of Law alumni
Year of birth missing (living people)
21st-century American politicians